Ferdinand G. "Fritz" Holtkamp (c. 1889 – 1944) was an American football player and coach of football and basketball. He served as the head football coach at the Agricultural and Mechanical College of the State of Mississippi—now known as Mississippi State University—from 1920 to 1921 and at Western Reserve University—now a part of Case Western Reserve University—from 1922 to 1925, compiling a career college football coaching record of 25–26–3. During his two-season tenure at Mississippi A&M, Holtkamp compiled a record of nine wins, seven losses, and one tie (9–7–1).  Holtkamp was also the head basketball coach at Western Reserve from 1922 to 1925.  He played college football at Ohio State University as a center from 1916 to 1919.  Holtkamp died in 1944 at the age of 55 at Pearl Harbor following a long illness.  He had been employed at the naval base as a civilian in construction.

Head coaching record

Football

References

Year of birth uncertain
1880s births
1944 deaths
American football centers
Case Western Spartans football coaches
Case Western Spartans men's basketball coaches
Mississippi State Bulldogs football coaches
Ohio State Buckeyes football players